The Marlei was a racing car built in Portugal by Mário Moreira Leite (bearing an acronym from his name) in the 1950s. It featured an aluminum body and Opel engine. Similar racing cars were constructed in Portugal during the same period when car races became very popular, including the DM (by Dionísio Mateu and Elísio de Melo), the Alba, the Olda, the FAP and the Etnerap.

Car manufacturers of Portugal